This is a list of the amphibian species recorded in Brazil. The total number of species is 946.

Anura

Amphignathodontidae
Fritziana fissilis (Miranda-Ribeiro, 1920)
Fritziana goeldii (Boulenger, 1895)
Fritziana ohausi (Wandolleck, 1907)
Gastrotheca albolineata (Lutz & Lutz, 1939)
Gastrotheca fissipes (Boulenger, 1888)
Gastrotheca microdiscus (Andersson in Lönnberg and Andersson, 1910)

Aromobatidae
Allobates alagoanus (Bokermann, 1967)
Allobates brunneus (Cope, 1887)
Allobates caeruleodactylus (Lima & Caldwell, 2001)
Allobates capixaba (Bokermann, 1967)
Allobates carioca (Bokermann, 1967)
Allobates conspicuus (Morales, 2002 "2000")
Allobates crombiei (Morales, 2002 "2000")
Allobates femoralis (Boulenger, 1884 "1883")
Allobates fuscellus (Morales, 2002 "2000")
Allobates gasconi (Morales, 2002 "2000")
Allobates goianus (Bokermann, 1975)
Allobates marchesianus (Melin, 1941)
Allobates masniger (Morales, 2002 "2000")
Allobates nidicola (Caldwell & Lima, 2003)
Allobates olfersioides (A. Lutz, 1925)
Allobates sumtuosus (Morales, 2000)
Allobates vanzolinius (Morales, 2000)
Anomaloglossus baeobatrachus (Boistel and de Massari, 1999)
Anomaloglossus beebei (Noble, 1923)
Anomaloglossus stepheni (Martins, 1989)
Anomaloglossus tamacuarensis (Myers & Donelly, 1997)

Brachycephalidae
Adelophryne baturitensis Hoogmoed, Borges, & Cascon, 1994
Adelophryne gutturosa Hoogmoed & Lescure, 1984
Adelophryne maranguapensis Hoogmoed, Borges, & Cascon, 1994
Adelophryne pachydactyla Hoogmoed, Borges, & Cascon, 1994
Barycholos ternetzi (Miranda-Ribeiro, 1937)
Brachycephalus alipioi Pombal & Gasparini, 2006
Brachycephalus brunneus Ribeiro, Alves, Haddad & dos Reis, 2005
Brachycephalus ferruginus Alves, Ribeiro, Haddad & dos Reis, 2006
Brachycephalus pombali Alves, Ribeiro, Haddad & dos Reis, 2006
Brachycephalus didactylus (Izecksohn, 1971)
Brachycephalus ephippium (Spix, 1824)
Brachycephalus hermogenesi (Giaretta & Sawaya, 1998)
Brachycephalus izecksohni Ribeiro, Alves, Haddad & dos Reis, 2005
Brachycephalus nodoterga Miranda-Ribeiro, 1920
Brachycephalus pernix Pombal, Wistuba & Bornschein, 1998
Brachycephalus vertebralis Pombal, 2001
Eleutherodactylus binotatus (Spix, 1824)
Eleutherodactylus heterodactylus (Miranda-Ribeiro, 1937)
Eleutherodactylus nigrovittatus Andersson, 1945
Eleutherodactylus plicifer (Boulenger, 1888)
Ischnocnema bilineata (Bokermann, 1975 "1974")
Ischnocnema bolbodactyla (A. Lutz, 1925)
Ischnocnema epipeda (Heyer, 1984)
Ischnenocnema erythromera (Heyer, 1984)
Ischnocnema gehrti (Miranda-Ribeiro, 1926)
Ischnocnema gualteri (B. Lutz, 1974)
Ischnocnema guentheri (Steindachner, 1864)
Ischnocnema henselii (Peters, 1872)
Ischnocnema hoehnei (B. Lutz, 1959 "1958")
Ischnocnema holti (Cochran, 1948)
Ischnocnema izecksohni (Caramaschi and Kisteumacher, 1989 "1988")
Ischnocnema juipoca (Sazima & Cardoso, 1978)
Ischnocnema lactea (Miranda-Ribeiro, 1923)
Ischnocnema manezinho (Garcia, 1996)
Ischnocnema nasuta (A. Lutz, 1925)
Ischnocnema nigriventris (A. Lutz, 1925)
Ischnocnema octavioi (Bokermann, 1965)
Ischnocnema oeus (Heyer, 1984)
Ischnocnema paranaensis (Langone & Segalla, 1996)
Ischnocnema parva (Girard, 1853)
Ischnocnema paulodutrai (Bokermann, 1975 "1974")
Ischnocnema pusilla (Bokermann, 1967)
Ischnocnema ramagii (Boulenger, 1888)
Ischnocnema randorum (Heyer, 1985)
Ischnocnema sambaqui (Castanho & Haddad, 2000)
Ischnocnema spanios (Heyer, 1985)
Ischnocnema venancioi (B. Lutz, 1959 "1958")
Ischnocnema verrucosus (Reinhardt and Lütken, 1862)
Ischnocnema vinhai (Bokermann, 1975 "1974")
Limnophys sulcatus (Cope, 1874)
Pristimantis acuminatus (Schreve, 1935)
Pristimantis altamazonicus (Barbour & Dunn, 1921)
Pristimantis buccinator (Rodriguez, 1994)
Pristimantis carvalhoi (B. Lutz in B. Lutz & Kloss, 1952)
Pristimantis chiastonotus (Lynch & Hoogmoed, 1977)
Pristimantis conspicillatus (Günther, 1858)
Pristimantis crepitans (Bokermann, 1965)
Pristimantis diadematus (Jiménez de la Espada, 1875)
Pristimantis dundeei (Heyer & Muñoz, 1999)
Pristomantis eurydactylus (Hedges & Schlüter, 1992)
Pristomantis fenestratus (Steindachner, 1864)
Pristimantis gutturalis (Hoogmoed, Lynch & Lescure, 1977)
Pristimantis lacrimosus (Jiménez de la Espada, 1875)
Pristimantis lanthanites (Lynch, 1975)
Pristimantis malkini (Lynch, 1980)
Pristimantis marmoratus (Boulenger, 1900)
Pristimantis martiae (Lynch, 1974)
Pristimantis memorans (Myers & Donelly, 1997)
Pristimantis ockendeni (Boulenger, 1912)
Pristimantis peruvianus (Melin, 1941)
Pristimantis skydmainos (Flores & Rodriguez, 1997)
Pristimantis toftae (Duellman, 1978)
Pristimantis variabilis (Lynch, 1968)
Pristimantis ventrimarmoratus (Boulenger, 1912)
Pristimantis vilarsi (Melin, 1941)
Pristimantis zeuctotylus (Lynch & Hoogmoed, 1977)
Pristimantis zimmermanae (Heyer & Hardy, 1991)
Euparkerella brasiliensis (Parker, 1926)
Euparkerella cochranae Izecksohn, 1988
Euparkerella robusta Izecksohn, 1988
Euparkerella tridactyla Izecksohn, 1988
Holoaden bradei B. Lutz, 1959 "1958"
Holoaden luederwaldti Miranda-Ribeiro, 1920
Oreobates quixensis Jiménez de la Espada, 1872
Phyllonastes myrmecoides (Lynch, 1976)
Phyzelaphryne miriamae Heyer, 1977

Bufonidae
Atelopus flavescens Duméril & Bibron, 1841
Atelopus spumarius Cope, 1871
Dendrophryniscus berthalutzae Izecksohn, 1994 "1993"
Dendrophryniscus bokermanni Izecksohn, 1994 "1993"
Dendrophryniscus brevipollicatus Jiménez de la Espada, 1871 "1870"
Dendrophryniscus carvalhoi Izecksohn, 1994 "1993"
Dendrophryniscus leucomystax Izecksohn, 1968
Dendrophryniscus minutus (Melin, 1941)
Dendrophryniscus stawiarskyi Izecksohn, 1994 "1993"
Frostius erythrophthalmus Pimenta & Caramaschi, 2007
Frostius pernambucensis (Bokermann, 1962)
Melanophryniscus admirabilis Di Bernardo, Maneyro & Grillo, 2006
Melanophryniscus atroluteus (Miranda-Ribeiro, 1920)
Melanophryniscus cambaraensis Braun & Braun, 1979
Melanophryniscus devincenzii Klappenbach, 1968
Melanophryniscus dorsalis (Mertens, 1933)
Melanophryniscus fulvoguttatus (Mertens, 1937)
Melanophryniscus macrogranulosus Braun, 1973
Melanophryniscus montevidensis (Philippi, 1902)
Melanophryniscus moreirae (Miranda-Ribeiro, 1920)
Melanophryniscus pachyrhynus (Miranda-Ribeiro, 1920)
Melanophryniscus simplex Caramaschi & Cruz, 2002
Melanophryniscus spectabilis Caramaschi & Cruz, 2002
Melanophryniscus tumifrons (Boulenger, 1905)
Oreophrynella quelchii Boulenger, 1895
Oreophrynella weiassipuensis Señaris, do Nascimento & Villarreal, 2005
Rhaebo anderssoni (Melin, 1941)
Rhaebo guttatus (Schneider, 1799)
Rhamphophryne proboscidea (Boulenger, 1882)
Rhinella abei (Baldissera-Jr, Caramaschi & Haddad, 2004)
Rhinella achavali (Maneyro, Arrieta & de Sá, 2004)
Rhinella acutirostris (Spix, 1824)
Rhinella arenarum (Hensel, 1867)
Rhinella bergi (Céspedez, 2000 "1999")
Rhinella castaneotica (Caldwell, 1991)
Rhinella ceratophrys (Boulenger, 1882)
Rhinella cerradensis Maciel, Brandão, Campos & Sebben, 2007
Rhinella crucifer (Wied-Neuwied, 1821)
Rhinella dapsilis (Myers & Carvalho, 1945)
Rhinella dorbignyi (Duméril & Bibron, 1841)
Rhinella fernandezae (Gallardo, 1957)
Rhinella granulosa (Spix, 1824)
Rhinella henseli (A. Lutz, 1934)
Rhinella hoogmoedi Caramaschi & Pombal, 2006
Rhinella icterica (Spix, 1824)
Rhinella jimi (Stevaux, 2002)
Rhinella margaritifera (Laurenti, 1768 )
Rhinella marina (Linnaeus, 1758)
Rhinella ocellata (Günther, 1859 "1858")
Rhinella ornata (Spix, 1824)
Rhinella pombali (Baldissera-Jr, Caramaschi & Haddad, 2004)
Rhinella proboscidea (Spix, 1824)
Rhinella pygmaea (Myers & Carvalho, 1952)
Rhinella roqueana (Melin, 1941)
Rhinella rubescens (A. Lutz, 1925)
Rhinella schneideri (Werner, 1894)
Rhinella scitula (Caramaschi & Niemeyer, 2003)
Rhinella veredas (Brandão, Maciel & Sebben, 2007)

Centrolenidae
Allophryne ruthveni Gaige, 1926
Cochranella midas (Lynch & Duellman, 1973)
Cochranella oyampiensis (Lescure, 1975)
Cochranella ritae (B. Lutz in B. Lutz & Kloss, 1952)
Hyalinobatrachium eurygnathum (A. Lutz, 1925)
Hyalinobatrachium nouraguensis Lescure & Marty, 2000
Hyalinobatrachium parvulum (Boulenger, 1895 "1894")
Hyalinobatrachium uranoscopum (Müller, 1924)

Ceratophryidae
Ceratophrys aurita (Raddi, 1823)
Ceratophrys cornuta (Linnaeus, 1758)
Ceratophrys cranwelli Barrio, 1980
Ceratophrys joazeirensis Mercadal de Barrio, 1986
Ceratophrys ornata (Bell, 1843)

Cryptobatrachidae
Stefania tamacuarina Myers and Donnelly, 1997

Cycloramphidae
Crossodactylodes bokermanni Peixoto, 1983 "1982"
Crossodactylodes izecksohni Peixoto, 1983 "1982"
Crossodactylodes pintoi Cochran, 1938
Cycloramphus acangatan Verdade & Rodrigues, 2003
Cycloramphus asper Werner, 1899
Cycloramphus bandeirensis Heyer, 1983
Cycloramphus bolitoglossus (Werner, 1897
Cycloramphus boraceiensis Heyer, 1983
Cycloramphus brasiliensis (Steindachner, 1864)
Cycloramphus carvalhoi Heyer, 1983
Cycloramphus catarinensis Heyer, 1983
Cycloramphus cedrensis Heyer, 1983
Cycloramphus diringshofeni Bokermann, 1957
Cycloramphus dubius (Miranda-Ribeiro, 1920)
Cycloramphus duseni (Andersson, 1914)
Cycloramphus eleutherodactylus (Miranda-Ribeiro, 1920)
Cycloramphus fulginosus Tschudi, 1838
Cycloramphus granulosus A. Lutz, 1929
Cycloramphus izecksohni Heyer, 1983
Cycloramphus jordanensis Heyer, 1983
Cycloramphus juimirim Haddad & Sazima, 1989
Cycloramphus lutzorum Heyer, 1983
Cycloramphus migueli Heyer, 1988
Cycloramphus mirandaribeiroi Heyer, 1983
Cycloramphus ohausi (Wandolleck, 1907)
Cycloramphus rhyakonastes Heyer, 1983
Cycloramphus semipalmatus (Miranda-Ribeiro, 1920)
Cycloramphus stejnegeri (Noble, 1924)
Cycloramphus valae Heyer, 1983
Limnomedusa macroglossa (Duméril & Bibron, 1841)
Macrogenioglottus alipioi Carvalho, 1946
Odontophrynus americanus (Duméril & Bibron, 1841)
Odontophrynus carvalhoi Savage & Cei, 1965
Odontophrynus cultripes Reinhardt & Lütken, 1861 "1862"
Odontophrynus moratoi Jim & Caramaschi, 1980
Odontophrynus salvatori Caramaschi, 1996
Proceratophrys appendiculata (Günther, 1873)
Proceratophrys avelinoi Mercadal del Barrio & Barrio, 1993
Proceratophrys bigibbosa (Peters, 1872)
Proceratophrys boiei (Wied-Neuwied, 1825)
Proceratophrys brauni Kwet & Faivovich, 2001
Proceratophrys concavitympanum Giaretta, Bernarde, & Kokubum, 2000
Proceratophrys cristiceps (Müller, 1884 "1883")
Proceratophrys cururu Eterovick & Sazima, 1998
Proceratophrys fryi (Günther, 1873)
Proceratophrys goyana (Miranda-Ribeiro, 1937)
Proceratophrys laticeps Izecksohn & Peixoto, 1981
Proceratophrys melanopogon (Miranda-Ribeiro, 1926)
Proceratophrys moehringi Weygoldt & Peixoto, 1985
Proceratophrys palustris Giaretta & Sazima, 1993
Proceratophrys paviotii Cruz, Prado & Izecksohn, 2005
Proceratophrys phyllostomus Izecksohn, Cruz, & Peixoto, 1999 "1998"
Proceratophrys schirchi (Miranda-Ribeiro, 1937)
Proceratophrys subguttata Izecksohn, Cruz, & Peixoto, 1999 "1998"
Rupirana cardosoi Heyer, 1999
Thoropa lutzi Cochran, 1938
Thoropa megatympanum Caramaschi & Sazima, 1984
Thoropa miliaris (Spix, 1824)
Thoropa petropolitana (Wandolleck, 1907)
Thoropa saxatilis Crocoft & Heyer, 1988
Thoropa taophora (Miranda-Ribeiro, 1923)
Zachaenus carvalhoi Izecksohn, 1983 "1982"
Zachaenus parvulus (Girard, 1853)

Dendrobatidae
Adelphobates castaneoticus (Caldwell & Myers, 1990)
Adelphobates galactonotus (Steindachner, 1864)
Adelphobates quinquevittatus (Steindachner, 1864)
Ameerega braccata (Steindachner, 1864)
Ameerega flavopicta (A. Lutz, 1925)
Ameerega hahneli (Boulenger, 1884 "1883")
Ameerega macero (Rodriguez & Myers, 1993)
Ameerega petersi (Silverstone, 1976)
Ameerega picta (Bibron in Tschudi, 1838)
Ameerega pulchripecta (Silverstone, 1976)
Ameerega trivittata (Spix, 1824)
Colostethus subfolionidificans Lima, Sanchez & Souza, 2007
Dendrobates leucomelas Steindachner, 1864
Dendrobates tinctorius (Cuvier, 1797)
Hyloxalus peruvianus (Melin, 1941)
Hyloxalus chlorocraspedus (Caldwell, 2005)
Ranitomeya vanzolinii (Myers, 1982)
Ranitomeya ventrimaculata (Shreve, 1935)

Hemiphractidae
Hemiphractus johnsoni (Noble, 1917)
Hemiphractus scutatus (Spix, 1824)

Hylidae
Aparasphenodon bokermanni Pombal, 1993
Aparasphenodon brunoi Miranda-Ribeiro, 1920
Aparasphenodon venezolanus (Mertens, 1950)
Aplastodiscus albofrenatus (A. Lutz, 1924)
Aplastodiscus albosignatus (A.Lutz & B.Lutz, 1938)
Aplastodiscus arildae (Cruz & Peixoto, 1987 "1985")
Aplastodiscus callipygius (Cruz & Peixoto, 1985 "1984")
Aplastodiscus cavicola (Cruz & Peixoto, 1985 "1984")
Aplastodiscus cochranae (Mertens, 1952)
Aplastodiscus ehrhardti (Müller, 1924)
Aplastodiscus eugenioi (Carvalho-e-Silva & Carvalho-e-Silva, 2005)
Aplastodiscus flumineus (Cruz & Peixoto, 1985 "1984")
Aplastodiscus ibirapitanga (Cruz, Pimenta & Silvano, 2003)
Aplastodiscus leucopygius (Cruz & Peixoto, 1985 "1984")
Aplastodiscus musicus (B.Lutz, 1948)
Aplastodiscus perviridis A. Lutz in B. Lutz, 1950
Aplastodiscus sibilatus (Cruz, Pimenta & Silvano, 2003)
Aplastodiscus weygoldti (Cruz & Peixoto, 1987 "1985")
Bokermannohyla ahenea (Napoli & Caramaschi, 2004)
Bokermannohyla alvarengai (Bokermann, 1956)
Bokermannohyla astartea (Bokermann, 1977)
Bokermannohyla caramaschii (Napoli, 2005)
Bokermannohyla carvalhoi (Peixoto, 1981)
Bokermannohyla circumdata (Cope, 1871)
Bokermannohyla claresignata (A. Lutz & B. Lutz, 1939)
Bokermannohyla clepsydra (A. Lutz, 1925)
Bokermannohyla diamantina Napoli & Juncá, 2006
Bokermannohyla feioi (Napoli & Caramaschi, 2004)
Bokermannohyla gouveai (Peixoto & Cruz, 1992)
Bokermannohyla hylax (Heyer, 1985)
Bokermannohyla ibitiguara (Cardoso, 1983)
Bokermannohyla ibitipoca (Caramaschi & Feio, 1990)
Bokermannohyla itapoty Lugli & Haddad, 2006
Bokermannohyla izecksohni (Jim & Caramaschi, 1979)
Bokermannohyla langei (Bokermann, 1965)
Bokermannohyla lucianae (Napoli & Pimenta, 2003)
Bokermannohyla luctuosa (Pombal & Haddad, 1993)
Bokermannohyla martinsi (Bokermann, 1964)
Bokermannohyla nanuzae (Bokermann & Sazima, 1973)
Bokermannohyla oxente Lugli & Haddad, 2006
Bokermannohyla pseudopseudis (Miranda-Ribeiro, 1937)
Bokermannohyla ravida (Caramaschi, Napoli & Bernardes, 2001)
Bokermannohyla saxicola (Bokermann, 1964)
Bokermannohyla sazimai (Cardoso & Andrade, 1983 "1982")
Bokermannohyla vulcaniae (Vasconcelos & Giaretta, 2004 "2003")
Corythomantis greeningi Boulenger, 1896
Cruziohyla craspedopus (Funkhouser, 1957)
Dendropsophus acreanus (Bokermann, 1964)
Dendropsophus anataliasiasi (Bokermann, 1972)
Dendropsophus anceps (A. Lutz, 1929)
Dendropsophus araguaya (Napoli & Caramaschi, 1998)
Dendropsophus berthalutzae (Bokermann, 1962)
Dendropsophus bifurcus (Andersson, 1945)
Dendropsophus bipunctatus (Spix, 1824)
Dendropsophus bokermanni (Goin, 1960)
Dendropsophus branneri (Cochran, 1948)
Dendropsophus brevifrons (Duellman & Crump, 1974)
Dendropsophus cachimbo (Napoli & Caramaschi, 1999)
Dendropsophus cerradensis (Napoli & Caramaschi, 1998)
Dendropsophus cruzi (Pombal & Bastos, 1998)
Dendropsophus decipiens (A. Lutz, 1925)
Dendropsophus dutrai (Gomes & Peixoto, 1996)
Dendropsophus elegans (Wied-Neuwied, 1824)
Dendropsophus elianeae (Napoli & Caramaschi, 2000)
Dendropsophus giesleri (Mertens, 1950)
Dendropsophus haddadi (Bastos & Pombal, 1996)
Dendropsophus haraldschultzi (Bokermann, 1962)
Dendropsophus jimi (Napoli & Caramaschi, 1999)
Dendropsophus koechlini (Duellman & Trueb, 1989)
Dendropsophus leali (Bokermann, 1964)
Dendropsophus leucophyllatus (Beireis, 1783)
Dendropsophus limai (Bokermann, 1962)
Dendropsophus marmoratus (Laurenti, 1768
Dendropsophus melanargyreus (Cope, 1887)
Dendropsophus meridianus (B. Lutz, 1954)
Dendropsophus microcephalus (Cope, 1886)
Dendropsophus microps (Peter, 1872)
Dendropsophus minimus (Ahl, 1933)
Dendropsophus minusculus (Rivero, 1971)
Dendropsophus minutus (Peters, 1872)
Dendropsophus miyatai (Vigle and Goberdhan-Vigle, 1990)
Dendropsophus nahdereri (B. Lutz & Bokermann, 1963)
Dendropsophus nanus (Boulenger, 1889)
Dendropsophus novaisi (Bokermann, 1968)
Dendropsophus oliveirai (Bokermann, 1963)
Dendropsophus parviceps (Boulenger, 1882)
Dendropsophus pauiniensis (Heyer, 1977)
Dendropsophus pseudomeridianus (Cruz, Caramaschi & Dias, 2000)
Dendropsophus rhea (Napoli & Caramaschi, 1999)
Dendropsophus rhodopeplus (Günther, 1859 "1858")
Dendropsophus riveroi (Cochran & Goin, 1970)
Dendropsophus rossalleni (Goin, 1959)
Dendropsophus rubicundulus (Reinhardt & Lütken, 1862 "1861")
Dendropsophus ruschii (Weygoldt & Peixoto, 1987)
Dendropsophus sanborni (Schmidt, 1944)
Dendropsophus sarayacuensis (Shreve, 1935)
Dendropsophus schubarti (Bokermann, 1963)
Dendropsophus seniculus (Cope, 1868)
Dendropsophus soaresi (Caramaschi & Jim, 1983)
Dendropsophus studerae (Carvalho e Silva, Carvalho e Silva & Izecksohn,
Dendropsophus timbeba (Martins & Cardoso, 1987)
Dendropsophus tintinnabulum (Melin, 1941)
Dendropsophus triangulum (Günther, 1869 "1868")
Dendropsophus tritaeniatus (Bokermann, 1965)
Dendropsophus walfordi (Bokermann, 1962)
Dendropsophus werneri (Cochran, 1952)
Dendropsophus xapuriensis (Martins & Cardoso, 1987)
Ecnomiohyla tuberculosa (Boulenger, 1882)
Hyla imitator (Barbour & Dunn, 1921)  incertae sedis
Hyla inframaculata Boulenger, 1882 incertae sedis
Calamita melanorabdotus sensu Frost, 2006 "Hyla" melanorhabdota, 1799)
Hylomantis aspera Peters, 1873 "1872"
Hylomantis granulosa (Cruz, 1989 "1988")
Hypsiboas albomarginatus (Spix, 1824)
Hypsiboas albopunctatus (Spix, 1824)
Hypsiboas atlanticus (Caramaschi & Velosa, 1996)
Hypsiboas beckeri (Caramaschi & Cruz, 2004)
Hypsiboas benitezi (Rivero, 1961)
Hypsiboas bischoffi (Boulenger, 1887)
Hypsiboas boans (Linnaeus, 1758)
Hypsiboas buriti (Caramaschi & Cruz, 1999)
Hypsiboas caingua (Carrizo, 1991 "1990")
Hypsiboas calcaratus (Troschel in Schomburgk, 1848)
Hypsiboas cinerascens (Spix, 1824)
Hypsiboas cipoensis (B.Lutz, 1968)
Hypsiboas crepitans (Wied-Neuwied, 1824)
Hypsiboas cymbalum (Bokerman, 1963)
Hypsiboas dentei (Bokermann, 1967)
Hypsiboas ericae (Caramaschi & Cruz, 2000)
Hypsiboas exastis (Caramaschi & Rodriguez, 2003)
Hypsiboas faber (Wied-Neuwied, 1821)
Hypsiboas fasciatus (Günther, 1859 "1858")
Hypsiboas freicanecae (Carnaval & Peixoto, 2004)
Hypsiboas geographicus (Spix, 1824)
Hypsiboas goianus (B. Lutz, 1968)
Hypsiboas guentheri (Boulenger, 1886)
Hypsiboas joaquini (Lutz, 1968)
Hypsiboas lanciformis (Cope, 1871)
Hypsiboas latistriatus (Caramaschi & Cruz, 2004)
Hypsiboas leptolineatus (P. Braun & C. Braun, 1977)
Hypsiboas leucocheilus (Carmaschi & Niemeyer, 2003)
Hypsiboas lundii (Burmeister, 1856)
Hypsiboas marginatus (Boulenger, 1887)
Hypsiboas microderma (Pyburn, 1977)
Hypsiboas multifasciatus (Günther, 1859 "1858")
Hypsiboas ornatissimus (Noble, 1923)
Hypsiboas pardalis (Spix, 1824)
Hypsiboas phaeopleura (Caramaschi & Cruz, 2000)
Hypsiboas polytaenius (Cope, 1870 "1869")
Hypsiboas pombali (Caramaschi, Pimenta & Feio, 2004)
Hypsiboas prasinus (Burmeister, 1856)
Hypsiboas pulchellus (Duméril & Bibron, 1841)
Hypsiboas punctatus (Schneider, 1799)
Hypsiboas raniceps Cope, 1862
Hypsiboas secedens (B. Lutz, 1963)
Hypsiboas semiguttatus (A. Lutz, 1925)
Hypsiboas semilineatus (Spix, 1824)
Hypsiboas stenocephalus (Caramaschi & Cruz, 1999)
Hypsiboas wavrini (Parker, 1936)
Itapotihyla langsdorffii (Duméril & Bibron, 1841)
Lysapsus caraya Gallardo, 1964
Lysapsus laevis Parker, 1935
Lysapsus limellum Cope, 1862
Osteocephalus buckleyi (Boulenger, 1882)
Osteocephalus cabrerai (Cochran & Goin, 1970)
Osteocephalus exophthalmus Smith & Noonan, 2001
Osteocephalus leprieurii (Duméril & Bibron, 1841)
Osteocephalus oophagus Jungfer & Schiesari, 1995
Osteocephalus pearsoni (Gaige, 1929)
Osteocephalus subtilis Martins & Cardoso, 1987
Osteocephalus taurinus Steindachner, 1862
Phasmahyla cochranae (Bokermann, 1966)
Phasmahyla exilis (Cruz, 1980)
Phasmahyla guttata (A. Lutz, 1924)
Phasmahyla jandaia (Bokermann & Sazima, 1978)
Phrynomedusa appendiculata (Lutz, 1925)
Phrynomedusa bokermanni Cruz, 1991
Phrynomedusa fimbriata Miranda-Ribeiro, 1923
Phrynomedusa marginata (Izecksohn & Cruz, 1976)
Phrynomedusa vanzolinii Cruz, 1991
Phyllodytes acuminatus Bokermann, 1966
Phyllodytes brevirostris Peixoto & Cruz, 1988
Phyllodytes edelmoi Peixoto, Caramaschi & Freire, 2003
Phyllodytes gyrinaethes Peixoto, Caramaschi & Freire, 2003
Phyllodytes kautskyi Peixoto & Cruz, 1988
Phyllodytes luteolus Wied-Neuwied, 1824
Phyllodytes maculosus Cruz, Feio & Cardoso, "2006" 2007
Phyllodytes melanomystax Caramaschi, Da Silva & Britto-Pereira, 1992
Phyllodytes punctatus Caramaschi & Peixoto, 2004
Phyllodytes tuberculosus Bokermann, 1966
Phyllodytes wuchereri (Peters, 1873 "1872")
Phyllomedusa araguari Giaretta, Oliveira-Filho & Kokubum, 2007
Phyllomedusa atelopoides Duellman, Cadle, & Cannatella, 1988
Phyllomedusa ayeaye (B. Lutz, 1966)
Phyllomedusa azurea Cope, 1862
Phyllomedusa bahiana A. Lutz, 1925
Phyllomedusa bicolor (Boddaert, 1772)
Phyllomedusa boliviana Boulenger, 1902
Phyllomedusa burmeisteri Boulenger, 1882
Phyllomedusa camba De la Riva, 2000 "1999"
Phyllomedusa centralis Bokermann, 1965
Phyllomedusa distincta A. Lutz in B. Lutz, 1950
Phyllomedusa hypochondrialis (Daudin, 1800)
Phyllomedusa iheringii Boulenger, 1885
Phyllomedusa itacolomi Caramaschi, Cruz & Feio, 2006
Phyllomedusa megacephala (Miranda-Ribeiro, 1926)
Phyllomedusa nordestina Caramaschi, 2006
Phyllomedusa oreades Brandão, 2002
Phyllomedusa palliata Peters, 1873 "1872"
Phyllomedusa rohdei Mertens, 1926
Phyllomedusa sauvagii Boulenger, 1882
Phyllomedusa tarsius (Cope, 1868)
Phyllomedusa tetraploidea Pombal & Haddad, 1992
Phyllomedusa tomopterna (Cope, 1868)
Phyllomedusa vaillantii Boulenger, 1882
Pseudis bolbodactyla A. Lutz, 1925
Pseudis cardosoi Kwet, 2000
Pseudis fusca Garman, 1883
Pseudis minuta Günther, 1859 "1858"
Pseudis paradoxa (Linnaeus, 1758)
Pseudis platensis Gallardo, 1961
Pseudis tocantins Caramaschi & Cruz, 1998
Scarthyla goinorum (Bokermann, 1962)
Scinax acuminatus (Cope, 1862)
Scinax agilis (Cruz & Peixoto, 1983)
Scinax albicans (Bokermann, 1967)
Scinax alcatraz (B. Lutz, 1973)
Scinax alter (B. Lutz, 1973)
Scinax angrensis (B. Lutz, 1973)
Scinax arduous Peixoto, 2002
Scinax argyreornatus (Miranda-Ribeiro, 1926)
Scinax ariadne (B. Lutz, 1973)
Scinax atratus (Peixoto, 1989)
Scinax auratus (Wied-Neuwied, 1821)
Scinax baumgardneri (Rivero, 1961)
Scinax berthae (Barrio, 1962)
Scinax blairi (Fouquette & Pyburn, 1972)
Scinax boesemani (Goin, 1966)
Scinax brieni (Witte, 1930)
Scinax cabralensis Drummond, Baêta & Pires, 2007
Scinax caldarum (B. Lutz, 1968)
Scinax canastrensis (Cardoso & Haddad, 1982)
Scinax cardosoi (Carvalho e Silva & Peixoto, 1991)
Scinax carnevallii (Caramaschi & Kisteumacher, 1989)
Scinax catharinae (Boulenger, 1888)
Scinax centralis Pombal & Bastos, 1996
Scinax constrictus Lima, Bastos & Giaretta, 2004
Scinax crospedospilus (A. Lutz, 1925)
Scinax cruentommus (Duellman, 1972)
Scinax curicica Pugliesse, Pombal & Sazima, 2004
Scinax cuspidatus (A. Lutz, 1925)
Scinax dolloi (Werner, 1903)
Scinax duartei (B. Lutz, 1951)
Scinax eurydice (Bokermann, 1968)
Scinax exiguus (Duellman, 1986)
Scinax faivovichi Brasileiro, Oyamaguchi & Haddad, 2007
Scinax flavoguttatus (Lutz & Lutz, 1939)
Scinax funereus (Cope, 1874)
Scinax fuscomarginatus (A. Lutz, 1925)
Scinax fuscovarius (A. Lutz, 1925)
Scinax garbei (Miranda-Ribeiro, 1926)
Scinax granulatus (Peters, 1871)
Scinax hayii (Barbour, 1909)
Scinax heyeri (Peixoto & Weygoldt, 1986)
Scinax hiemalis (Haddad & Pombal, 1987)
Scinax humilis (B. Lutz, 1954)
Scinax jureia (Pombal & Gordo, 1991)
Scinax kautskyi (Carvalho e Silva & Peixoto, 1991)
Scinax lindsayi Pyburn, 1992
Scinax littoralis (Pombal & Gordo, 1991)
Scinax littoreus (Peixoto, 1988)
Scinax longilineus (B. Lutz, 1968)
Scinax luizotavioi (Caramaschi & Kisteumacher, 1989)
Scinax machadoi (Bokermann & Sazima, 1973)
Scinax maracaya (Cardoso & Sazima, 1980)
Scinax melloi (Peixoto, 1989)
Scinax nasicus (Cope, 1862)
Scinax nebulosus (Spix, 1824)
Scinax obtriangulatus (B. Lutz, 1973)
Scinax pachycrus (Miranda-Ribeiro, 1937)
Scinax parkeri (Gaige, 1929)
Scinax peixotoi Brasileiro, Haddad, Sawaya & Martins, 2007
Scinax perereca Pombal, Haddad & Kasahara, 1995
Scinax perpusillus (A. Lutz & B. Lutz, 1939)
Scinax pinima (Bokermann & Sazima, 1973)
Scinax proboscideus (Brongersma, 1933)
Scinax ranki (Andrade & Cardoso, 1987)
Scinax rizibilis (Bokermann, 1964)
Scinax ruber (Laurenti, 1768)
Scinax similis (Cochran, 1952)
Scinax squalirostris (A. Lutz, 1925)
Scinax strigilatus (Spix, 1824)
Scinax trapicheiroi (B. Lutz, 1954)
Scinax trilineatus (Hoogmoed & Gorzula, 1977)
Scinax uruguayus (Schmidt, 1944)
Scinax v-signatus (B. Lutz, 1968)
Scinax x-signatus (Spix, 1824)
Sphaenorhynchus bromelicola Bokermann, 1966
Sphaenorhynchus carneus (Cope, 1868)
Sphaenorhynchus dorisae (Goin, 1957)
Sphaenorhynchus lacteus (Daudin, 1800)
Sphaenorhynchus orophilus (A. Lutz & B. Lutz, 1938)
Sphaenorhynchus palustris Bokermann, 1966
Sphaenorhynchus pauloalvini Bokermann, 1973
Sphaenorhynchus planicola (A. Lutz & B. Lutz, 1938)
Sphaenorhynchus prasinus Bokermann, 1973
Sphaenorhynchus surdus (Cochran, 1953)
Trachycephalus adenodermus (Lutz, 1968)
Trachycephalus atlas Bokermann, 1966
Trachycephalus coriaceus (Peters, 1867)
Trachycephalus imitatrix (Miranda-Ribeiro, 1926)
Trachycephalus lepidus (Pombal, Haddad & Cruz, 2003)
Trachycephalus mesophaeus (Hensel, 1867)
Trachycephalus nigromaculatus Tschudi, 1838
Trachycephalus resinifictrix (Goeldi, 1907)
Trachycephalus venulosus (Laurenti, 1768)
Xenohyla eugenioi Caramaschi, 1998
Xenohyla truncata (Izecksohn, 1959)

Hylodidae
Crossodactylus aeneus Müller, 1924
Crossodactylus bokermanni Caramaschi & Sazima, 1985
Crossodactylus caramaschii Bastos & Pombal, 1995
Crossodactylus cyclospinus Nascimento, Cruz & Feio, 2005
Crossodactylus dantei Carcerelli & Caramaschi, 1993 "1992
Crossodactylus dispar A. Lutz, 1925
Crossodactylus gaudichaudii Duméril & Bibron, 1841
Crossodactylus grandis B. Lutz, 1951
Crossodactylus lutzorum Carcerelli & Caramaschi, 1993 "1992"
Crossodactylus schmidti Gallardo, 1961
Crossodactylus trachystomus (Reinhardt & Lütken, 1862 "1861")
Hylodes amnicola Pombal, Feio & Haddad, 2002
Hylodes asper (Müller, 1924)
Hylodes babax Heyer, 1982
Hylodes charadranaetes Heyer & Cocroft, 1986
Hylodes dactylocinus Pavan, Narvaes & Rodrigues, 2001
Hylodes fredi Canedo & Pombal, 2007
Hylodes glaber (Miranda-Ribeiro, 1926)
Hylodes heyeri Haddad, Pombal & Bastos, 1996
Hylodes lateristrigatus (Baumann, 1912)
Hylodes magalhaesi (Bokermann, 1964)
Hylodes meridionalis (Mertens, 1927)
Hylodes mertensi (Bokermann, 1956)
Hylodes nasus (Lichtenstein, 1823)
Hylodes ornatus (Bokermann, 1967)
Hylodes otavioi Sazima & Bokermann, 1983 "1982"
Hylodes perplicatus (Miranda-Ribeiro, 1926)
Hylodes phyllodes Heyer & Cocroft, 1986
Hylodes pipilans Canedo & Pombal, 2007
Hylodes regius Gouvêa, 1979
Hylodes sazima Haddad & Pombal, 1995
Hylodes uai Nascimento, Pombal & Haddad, 2001
Hylodes vanzolinii Heyer, 1982
Megaelosia apuana Pombal, Prado & Canedo, 2003
Megaelosia bocainensis Giaretta, Bokermann & Haddad, 1993
Megaelosia boticariana Giaretta & Aguiar, 1998
Megaelosia goeldii (Baumann, 1912)
Megaelosia lutzae Izecksohn & Gouvêa, 1985
Megaelosia massarti (Witte, 1930)

Leiuperidae
Edalorhina perezi Jiménez de la Espada, 1871 "1870"
Engystomops petersi Jiménez de la Espada, 1872
Eupemphix nattereri Steindachner, 1863
Physalaemus aguirrei Bokermann, 1966
Physalaemus albifrons (Spix, 1824)
Physalaemus albonotatus (Steindachner, 1864)
Physalaemus angrensis Weber, Gonzaga & Carvalho-e-Silva, 2005
Physalaemus atlanticus Haddad & Sazima, 2004
Physalaemus barrioi Bokermann, 1967
Physalaemus biligonigerus (Cope, 1861 "1860")
Physalaemus bokermanni Cardoso & Haddad, 1985
Physalaemus caete Pombal & Madureira, 1997
Physalaemus camacan Pimenta, Cruz & Silvano, 2005
Physalaemus centralis Bokermann, 1962
Physalaemus cicada Bokermann, 1966
Physalaemus crombiei Heyer & Wolf, 1989
Physalaemus cuvieri Fitzinger, 1826
Physalaemus deimaticus Sazima & Caramaschi, 1988 "1986"
Physalaemus ephippifer (Steindachner, 1864)
Physalaemus erikae Cruz & Pimenta, 2004
Physalaemus erythros Caramaschi, Feio & Guimarães-Neto, 2003
Physalaemus evangelistai Bokermann, 1967
Physalaemus gracilis (Boulenger, 1883)
Physalaemus henselii (Peters, 1872)
Physalaemus irroratus Cruz, Nascimento & Feio, 2007
Physalaemus jordanensis Bokermann, 1967
Physalaemus kroyeri (Reinhardt & Lütken, 1862 "1861")
Physalaemus lisei Braun & Braun, 1977
Physalaemus maculiventris (Lutz, 1925)
Physalaemus marmoratus (Reinhardt & Lütken, 1862 "1861")
Physalaemus maximus Feio, Pombal, & Caramaschi, 1999
Physalaemus moreirae (Miranda-Ribeiro, 1937)
Physalaemus nanus (Boulenger, 1888)
Physalaemus obtectus Bokermann, 1966
Physalaemus olfersii (Lichtenstein & Martens, 1856)
Physalaemus riograndensis Milstead, 1960
Physalaemus rupestris Caramaschi, Carcerelli, & Feio, 1991
Physalaemus signifer (Girard, 1853)
Physalaemus soaresi Izecksohn, 1965
Physalaemus spiniger (Miranda-Ribeiro, 1926)
Pleurodema bibroni Tschudi, 1838
Pleurodema brachyops (Cope, 1869 "1868")
Pleurodema diplolister (Peters, 1870)
Pleurodema fuscomaculata (Steindachner, 1864)
Pseudopaludicola boliviana Parker, 1927
Pseudopaludicola canga Giaretta & Kokubum, 2003
Pseudopaludicola ceratophryes Rivero & Serna, 1984
Pseudopaludicola falcipes (Hensel, 1867)
Pseudopaludicola mineira Lobo, 1994
Pseudopaludicola mystacalis (Cope, 1887)
Pseudopaludicola riopiedadensis Mercadal de Barrio & Barrio, 1994
Pseudopaludicola saltica (Cope, 1887)
Pseudopaludicola ternetzi Miranda-Ribeiro, 1937

Leptodactylidae
Hydrolaetare dantasi (Bokermann, 1959)
Hydrolaetare schmidti (Cochran & Goin, 1959)
Leptodactylus andreae Müller, 1923
Leptodactylus araucarius (Kwet & Angulo, 2003)
Leptodactylus bokermanni Heyer, 1973
Leptodactylus bolivianus Boulenger, 1898
Leptodactylus bufonius Boulenger, 1894
Leptodactylus caatingae Heyer & Juncá, 2003
Leptodactylus camaquara Sazima & Bokermann, 1978
Leptodactylus chaquensis Cei, 1950
Leptodactylus cunicularius Sazima & Bokermann, 1978
Leptodactylus didymus Heyer, García-Lopez & Cardoso, 1996
Leptodactylus diedrus Heyer, 1994
Leptodactylus diptyx Boettger, 1885
Leptodactylus discodactylus Boulenger, 1884 "1883"
Leptodactylus elenae Heyer, 1978
Leptodactylus flavopictus Lutz, 1926
Leptodactylus furnarius Sazima & Bokermann, 1978
Leptodactylus fuscus (Schneider, 1799)
Leptodactylus gracilis (Duméril & Bibron, 1841)
Leptodactylus hylaedactylus (Cope, 1868)
Leptodactylus hylodes (Reinhardt & Lütken, 1862 "1861")
Leptodactylus jolyi Sazima & Bokermann, 1978
Leptodactylus knudseni Heyer, 1972
Leptodactylus labyrinthicus (Spix, 1824)
Leptodactylus latinasus Jiménez de la Espada, 1875
Leptodactylus lauramiriamae Heyer and Crombie, 2005
Leptodactylus leptodactyloides (Andersson, 1945)
Leptodactylus lineatus (Schneider, 1799)
Leptodactylus longirostris Boulenger, 1882
Leptodactylus macrosternum Miranda-Ribeiro, 1926
Leptodactylus marambaiae Izecksohn, 1976
Leptodactylus marmoratus (Steindachner, 1867)
Leptodactylus martinezi (Bokermann, 1956)
Leptodactylus myersi Heyer, 1995
Leptodactylus mystaceus (Spix, 1824)
Leptodactylus mystacinus (Burmeister, 1861)
Leptodactylus nanus Müller, 1922
Leptodactylus natalensis A. Lutz, 1930
Leptodactylus notoaktites Heyer, 1978
Leptodactylus ocellatus (Linnaeus, 1758)
Leptodactylus paraensis Heyer, 2005
Leptodactylus pentadactylus (Laurenti, 1768)
Leptodactylus petersii (Steindachner, 1864)
Leptodactylus plaumanni Ahl, 1936
Leptodactylus podicipinus (Cope, 1862)
Leptodactylus pustulatus (Peters, 1870)
Leptodactylus rhodomystax Boulenger, 1884 "1883"
Leptodactylus rhodonotus (Günther, 1869 "1868")
Leptodactylus riveroi Heyer & Pyburn, 1983
Leptodactylus rugosus Noble, 1923
Leptodactylus sabanensis Heyer, 1994
Leptodactylus sertanejo Giaretta & Costa, 2007
Leptodactylus spixi Heyer, 1983
Leptodactylus stenodema Jiménez de la Espada, 1875
Leptodactylus syphax Bokermann, 1969
Leptodactylus tapiti Sazima & Bokermann, 1978
Leptodactylus thomei Almeida & Angulo 2006
Leptodactylus troglodytes A. Lutz, 1926
Leptodactylus validus Garman, 1888
Leptodactylus vastus A. Lutz, 1930
Leptodactylus viridis Jim & Spirandeli-Cruz, 1973
Leptodactylus wagneri (Peters, 1862)
Paratelmatobius cardosoi Pombal & Haddad, 1999
Paratelmatobius gaigeae (Cochran, 1938)
Paratelmatobius lutzii Lutz & Carvalho, 1958
Paratelmatobius mantiqueira Pombal & Haddad, 1999
Paratelmatobius poecilogaster Giaretta & Castanho, 1990
Scythrophrys sawayae (Cochran, 1953)

Microhylidae
Arcovomer passarellii Carvalho, 1954
Chiasmocleis alagoanus Cruz, Caramaschi & Freire, 1999
Chiasmocleis albopunctata (Boettger, 1885)
Chiasmocleis atlantica Cruz, Caramaschi & Izecksohn, 1997
Chiasmocleis bassleri Dunn, 1949
Chiasmocleis capixaba Cruz, Caramaschi & Izecksohn, 1997
Chiasmocleis carvalhoi Cruz, Caramaschi & Izecksohn, 1997
Chiasmocleis centralis Bokermann, 1952
Chiasmocleis cordeiroi Caramaschi & Pimenta, 2003
Chiasmocleis crucis Caramaschi & Pimenta, 2003
Chiasmocleis gnoma Canedo, Dixo & Pombal, 2004
Chiasmocleis hudsoni Parker, 1940
Chiasmocleis jimi Caramaschi & Cruz, 2001
Chiasmocleis leucosticta (Boulenger, 1888)
Chiasmocleis mehelyi Caramaschi & Cruz, 1997
Chiasmocleis sapiranga Cruz, Caramaschi & Napoli, 2007
Chiasmocleis schubarti Bokermann, 1952
Chiasmocleis shudikarensis Dunn, 1949
Chiasmocleis ventrimaculata (Andersson, 1945)
Ctenophryne geayi Mocquard, 1904
Dasypops schirchi Miranda-Ribeiro, 1924
Dermatonotus muelleri (Boettger, 1885)
Elachistocleis bicolor (Valenciennes in Guérin-Menéville, 1838)
Elachistocleis erythrogaster Kwet & Di-Bernardo, 1998
Elachistocleis ovalis (Schneider, 1799)
Elachistocleis piauiensis Caramaschi & Jim, 1983
Hamptophryne boliviana (Parker, 1927)
Hyophryne histrio Carvalho, 1954
Myersiella microps (Duméril & Bibron, 1841)
Otophryne pyburni Campbell & Clarke, 1998
Stereocyclops incrassatus Cope, 1870 "1869"
Stereocyclops parkeri (Wettstein, 1934)
Synapturanus mirandaribeiroi Nelson & Lescure, 1975
Synapturanus salseri Pyburn, 1975
Syncope tridactyla (Duellman & Medelson, 1995)

Pipidae
Pipa arrabali Izecksohn, 1976
Pipa aspera Müller, 1924
Pipa carvalhoi (Miranda-Ribeiro, 1937)
Pipa pipa (Linnaeus, 1758)
Pipa snethlageae Müller, 1914

Ranidae
Rana catesbeiana Shaw, 1802 introduced
Rana palmipes Spix, 1824

Caudata

Plethodontidae
Bolitoglossa paraensis (Unterstein, 1930)

Gymnophiona

Caeciliidae
Atretochoana eiselti (Taylor, 1968)
Brasilotyphlus braziliensis (Dunn, 1945)
Caecilia armata Dunn, 1942
Caecilia gracilis Shaw, 1802
Caecilia tentaculata Linnaeus, 1758
Chthonerpeton arii Cascon & Lima-Verde, 1994
Chthonerpeton braestrupi Taylor, 1968
Chthonerpeton exile Nussbaum & Wilkinson, 1987
Chthonerpeton indistinctum (Reinhardt & Lütken, 1862 "1861")
Chthonerpeton noctinectes da Silva, Britto-Pereira & Caramaschi, 2003
Chthonerpeton perissodus Nussbaum & Wilkinson 1987
Chthonerpeton viviparum Parker & Wettstein, 1929
Luetkenotyphlus brasiliensis (Lütken, 1852 "1851")
Microcaecilia supernumeraria Taylor, 1969
Mimosiphonops reinhardti Wilkinson & Nussbaum, 1992
Mimosiphonops vermiculatus Taylor, 1968
Nectocaecilia petersii (Boulenger, 1882)
Oscaecilia hypereumeces Taylor, 1968
Potamotyphlus kaupii (Berthold, 1859)
Siphonops annulatus (Mikan, 1820)
Siphonops hardyi Boulenger, 1888
Siphonops insulanus Ihering, 1911
Siphonops leucoderus Taylor, 1968
Siphonops paulensis Boettger, 1892
Typhlonectes compressicauda (Duméril & Bibron, 1841)
Typhlonectes cunhai Cascon, Lima-Verde & Marques, 1991

Rhinatrematidae
Rhinatrema bivittatum (Cuvier in Guérin-Méneville, 1829)

See also
Wildlife of Brazil
List of Brazilian birds
List of Brazilian mammals
List of Brazilian reptiles
List of regional amphibians lists

References
SBH.2012.Brazilian amphibians – List of species. Accessible at Sociedade Brasileira de Herpetologia.

 
Brazil
Amphibians
Brazil